Pleioblastus viridistriatus, kamuro-zasa, is a species of bamboo in the grass family Poaceae, native to Japan.

It is classified as a running bamboo, with underground rhizomes that spread rapidly in multiple directions, forming thickets. In a garden situation it can be invasive. However, its ornamental qualities make it a desirable subject for gardens, and it has received the Royal Horticultural Society's Award of Garden Merit.

References 
 

Flora of Japan
Bambusoideae